Ellen J. Kennedy is the founder and Executive Director of World Without Genocide, a human rights organization headquartered at Mitchell Hamline School of Law, St. Paul, MN.

Through World Without Genocide, Kennedy promotes Holocaust and genocide education in high schools, colleges, faith-based organizations, and civic groups and advocates with elected officials at city, state, and national levels on genocide prevention. Kennedy was a professor at the University of St. Thomas for nearly twenty years and the Interim Director at the Center for Holocaust and Genocide Studies, University of Minnesota, for three years. She founded World Without Genocide with support from her students at the University of St. Thomas in 2006. She has been an adjunct professor at Mitchell Hamline School of Law since 2006 and remains in that position today. She also taught at many colleges and universities abroad, including in China, Ukraine, Poland, India, Japan, Costa Rica, England, Israel, Jamaica, and Australia. She speaks at conferences and events locally, nationally, and internationally. On December 10, 2021, World Without Genocide was designated as formally associated with the United Nations Department of Global Communications.  Dr. Ellen Kennedy is a representative of World Without Genocide to the Department.

Education

Dr. Kennedy earned a Bachelor of Arts in English and Psychology from the University of Michigan. She has masters degrees in Communications and English from Northern Michigan University and a masters in Sociology from the University of Minnesota. She also has two doctorates from the University of Minnesota.

Published articles

Kennedy has published many articles on human rights and genocide in academic and mass publications.  Kennedy was also a regular contributor for Minnesota Public Radio from 2010 to 2012.

Awards
Dr. Kennedy has received the following awards:
 Prominent Minnesotan, Osher Lifelong Learning Institute, 2019
 Human Rights Award, United Nations Office of Church Women United, 2015
 Woman of Achievement Award, DKG, international women educators’ society, 2014
 Rotarian of the Year, Minneapolis University Rotary Club, 2012-2013
 Nominee, Outstanding Adjunct Faculty, William Mitchell College of Law, 2012
 Change-Maker Award, Minnesota Women’s Press, 2010
 Community Service Staff Award, University of Minnesota, 2010
 Jane Addams Outstanding Women’s Service Award, Midwest Sociological Society, 2010
 Outstanding Citizen Award, Anne Frank Center, New York, 2009
 Human Rights Award, City of Edina, Minnesota, 2007
 Higher Education Leader of the Year Award, National Society for Experiential Education, 2004 
 Fulbright Senior Specialist, 2006-2011
 Global Citizenship Award, University of St. Thomas, 2002
 Research Service Award, University of St. Thomas, 1987

References

Genocide education
University of Minnesota College of Liberal Arts alumni
Year of birth missing (living people)
Living people
Northern Michigan University alumni
University of St. Thomas (Minnesota) faculty
Carlson School of Management alumni